The Shakedown is a 1959 black and white British crime-drama film directed by John Lemont, starring Terence Morgan, Hazel Court, and Donald Pleasence. It was filmed in the United Kingdom.

The film was banned in Finland (known there as Häväistyksen kauppiaat).

Plot
Augustus ("Augie") Cortona, a recently released convict, opens up a modelling school and photographic studio that serves as a front for a service enabling amateurs to take erotic photographs, while blackmailing some of the participants by taking pictures through a two-way mirror of their participation. Meanwhile, a longstanding feud with a rival gangster who took over his operation while he was imprisoned continues. Scotland Yard decide to investigate Cortona by sending an officer, Mildred Eyde, (Hazel Court), to operate undercover by enrolling as a student model. Cortona is smitten by Eyde and begins to woo her.

Eyde's cover is blown when Spettigue is informed that she is a policewoman by a fellow con who recognizes her. Police raid the studio in order to rescue her. Cortona tries to flee but is shot by a waiting blackmail victim who has been pushed too far by repeated threats of exposure and demands for ever more money. As Cortona is dying, despite her feelings of moral disgust, Mildred's pity kneels down, and tries to comfort him. But with his last breath, Cortona repulses her, and says "You're a Bitch". Mildred is led away, appalled.

Cast
 Terence Morgan as Augie Cortona 
 Hazel Court as Mildred Eyde 
 Donald Pleasence as Jessel Brown 
 Bill Owen as David Spettigue 
 Robert Beatty as Chief Inspector Bob Jarvis 
 Harry H. Corbett as Gollar 
 Gene Anderson as Zena 
 Eddie Byrne as George, Barman 
 John Salew as John Arnold 
 Georgina Cookson as Miss Firbank
 Linda Castle as Sylvia
Jackie Collins as Rita Mason (credited as Lynn Curtis)
 Joan Haythorne as Miss Ogilvie 
 Sheila Buxton as Nadia 
 Dorinda Stevens as Grace 
 Jack Lambert as Sergeant Kershaw
 Charles Lamb as Pinza 
 Edward Judd as Bernie
 Larry Taylor as Second Thug 
 Angela Douglas as Model
 Arthur Lovegrove as Barman
 Paul Whitsun-Jones as Fat Drinker
 Diana Chesney as Purple Woman
 Timothy Bateson as Estate Agent
 Neal Arden as Harry Bowers

Production
The film was made at Twickenham Film Studios, and on location. A collection of location stills and corresponding contemporary photographs is hosted at reelstreets.com.

Critical reception
TV Guide wrote: "the performances are all strong and believable, and fast-paced direction helps to gloss over some of the inadequacies in the predictable script."

External links

References

1959 films
British black-and-white films
1959 crime drama films
British crime drama films
Films directed by John Lemont
1950s English-language films
1950s British films